"All Night" is a song by RM and Suga of the South Korean boy band BTS and American rapper Juice Wrld, released on June 21, 2019. It is the third single to be taken from the BTS World: Original Soundtrack, and was produced by RM.

Background
The song was described as a "moderate tempo hip hop song with a 90's chill vibe". It also features beats produced by Powers Pleasant.

Track listing

Charts

Release history

References

2019 singles
2019 songs
BTS songs
Juice Wrld songs
Songs written by Juice Wrld
Songs written by RM (rapper)
Songs written by Suga (rapper)
Hybe Corporation singles